Ádám Vezér (born 21 September 1974) is a retired Hungarian goalkeeper who last played for Monori SE in the Hungarian National Championship III.

Honours
UEFA Cup Winners' Cup:  1st Round: 1996/97

External links
HLSZ
UEFA.com
eufo.de
 Medved.M
Bleicher, Y. 2001
Spencer, N. 1996
Cup winner's Cup 1996/97

1974 births
Living people
Association football goalkeepers
Hungarian footballers
Budapest Honvéd FC players
BFC Siófok players
Vecsés FC footballers
Maccabi Tel Aviv F.C. players
Beitar Be'er Sheva F.C. players
Anagennisi Deryneia FC players
AC Omonia players
Alki Larnaca FC players
Ethnikos Assia FC players
BKV Előre SC footballers
Monori SE players
Nemzeti Bajnokság I players
Israeli Premier League players
Liga Leumit players
Cypriot First Division players
Cypriot Second Division players
Hungarian expatriate footballers
Expatriate footballers in Israel
Expatriate footballers in Cyprus
Footballers from Budapest